Booker Taylor Brown (September 25, 1952 – July 18, 2022) was an American football offensive tackle who played two seasons with the San Diego Chargers of the National Football League (NFL). He was drafted by the Houston Oilers in the sixth round of the 1974 NFL Draft. Brown first enrolled at Santa Barbara City College before transferring to the University of Southern California. He attended Santa Barbara High School in Santa Barbara, California. He was a consensus All-American in 1973. He was also a member of the Southern California Sun of the World Football League.

In 2019, Brown was inducted into the Santa Barbara City College Athletics Hall of Fame as a member of their inaugural class. On July 18, 2022, Brown died after an extended illness.

References

External links
Just Sports Stats

1952 births
2022 deaths
Players of American football from Mississippi
American football offensive tackles
African-American players of American football
USC Trojans football players
Southern California Sun players
San Diego Chargers players
All-American college football players
People from Wesson, Mississippi
Santa Barbara City Vaqueros football players
21st-century African-American people
20th-century African-American sportspeople